There are 11 Grade I listed buildings in Ipswich, a non-metropolitan district and the county town of Suffolk, England.

In the United Kingdom, the term listed building refers to a building or other structure officially designated as being of "exceptional architectural or historic special interest"; Grade I structures are those considered to be "buildings of "exceptional interest, sometimes considered to be internationally important. Just 2.5% of listed buildings are Grade I." The total number of listed buildings in England is 372,905. In England, the authority for listing under the Planning (Listed Buildings and Conservation Areas) Act 1990 rests with English Heritage, a non-departmental public body sponsored by the Department for Culture, Media and Sport.

Ipswich is an unparished area, like many urbanized districts, with only 85% of the town population actually living in the area of the borough.

Ipswich

|}

See also
Grade II* listed buildings in Ipswich

Notes

References

Bibliography

External links

 
Ipswich